These are the Kowloon East results of the 2012 Hong Kong legislative election. The election was held on 9 September 2012 and all 5 seats in Kowloon East where consisted of Wong Tai Sin District and Kwun Tong District were contested. It was the first time the Pro-Beijing camp gained the majority of the Kowloon East seats. The Democratic Party, Democratic Alliance for the Betterment and Progress of Hong Kong, Federation of Trade Unions and Civic Party each secured their party's incumbent seat. The new last seat was gained by the pro-Beijing independent candidate Paul Tse, defeating the two radical democrats Wong Yeung-tat and Andrew To and former LegCo member Mandy Tam with narrow margin.

Overall results
Before election:

Change in composition:

Candidates list

Results by districts

Opinion polling

See also
Legislative Council of Hong Kong
Hong Kong legislative elections
2012 Hong Kong legislative election

References

2012 Hong Kong legislative election